Carlos di Laura (born 19 October 1964) is a former tennis player from Peru.

He participated in the 1984 Summer Olympics for his native country. The left-hander won three tour doubles titles during his professional career.

Di Laura reached his highest singles ranking on 12 May 1986, when he became the world No. 92.

Career finals

Doubles (3 titles, 2 runner-ups)

References

External links
 
 
 

1964 births
Living people
Olympic tennis players of Peru
Pepperdine Waves men's tennis players
Peruvian expatriates in the United States
Peruvian male tennis players
Tennis players at the 1984 Summer Olympics
20th-century Peruvian people
21st-century Peruvian people